Final (Vol. 1) is the eleventh studio album recorded by Spanish singer Enrique Iglesias. Volume 1 was released on 17 September 2021 by RCA Records through Sony Music Latin. The album features collaborations with several artists and is going to occur in Volume 1 and Volume 2. During a live chat with Ricky Martin and Sebastián Yatra on Instagram on 3 September 2021, Iglesias suggested that Final would be the last album he would release.

Background 
Starting in 2016, the album was preceded by a number of singles that were intended to be included on the upcoming album. These singles included "Duele El Corazon", "Subeme La Radio", "El Baño" and "Move to Miami". The album was originally scheduled to come out in 2017, but was pushed back due to Iglesias' touring commitments, so instead more singles were released. The COVID-19 pandemic gave Iglesias the opportunity to go into the studio and start work on both volumes of the album. In an interview with Rolling Stone he explained, "I wanted to release this album in 2017, and I just keep putting out singles. I was touring a lot and I didn't have time to go to the studio. And the last year, I've had a lot of time to go to the studio and just work there by myself and to work with Carlos [Paucar] a lot and just go back and forth and finish up what I've needed to finish up for the last three years."

As well as the previously-released singles which were collaborations with Wisin, Descemer Bueno, Zion & Lennox, Bad Bunny and Pitbull, the album also includes his 2015 duet with Nicky Jam, "El Perdon". The album also includes three new Spanish tracks, such as "Me Pasé" featuring Puerto Rican rapper Farruko and "Te Fuiste" featuring Myke Towers, as well as three new English-language tracks.

During a video chat with Ricky Martin and Sebastian Yatra to promote their joint tour, Iglesias revealed that the album would be a two-part release entitled Final, as these would be the last albums of his career. Iglesias claimed, "it's something that I have been thinking about for the past few years" but also insisted, "I'm never going to stop writing songs because I love writing songs, but I'm going to do it in a different way, meaning they don't necessarily have to be packaged as an album, so this project to me is important".

Final Vol. 1 was Iglesias' first studio album not to have an accompanying physical release upon its debut, though CD copies were released shortly thereafter.

Commercial performance
The album debuted at number 12 on Billboards Top Latin Albums and number two on the Latin Pop Albums chart. This became Iglesias' first studio album to miss the Billboard 200, selling 4,000 album equivalent units in its first week. However, it reached number 45 in Iglesias' home country of Spain, number 41 in Portugal, and number 56 in Switzerland.

Critical reception

Roisin O'Connor from The Independent gave the album two out of five stars. She stated that Iglesias was "worn out" and described the album as "surprisingly unsexy", which positioned him "more as court jester than the Latin king he once was". She called "Chasing the Sun" a "bland auto-tune fest" and although she thought "things pick up a tiny bit" on "Me Pasé" and "Súbeme la Radio", she described "El Baño" as "ludicrous", criticising its lyrics about how Iglesias's lover "can 'make [him] so hard'" that he wants to go to the bathroom to have sex.

Track listing

Charts

Weekly charts

Year-end charts

Certifications

References

2021 albums
Enrique Iglesias albums
Spanish-language albums